Stillman College is a private historically black Presbyterian college in Tuscaloosa, Alabama. It awards the Bachelor of Arts and Bachelor of Science degrees in 17 programs housed within three academic schools (Arts and Sciences, Business Administration, and Education). The college has an average enrollment of 650 students and is accredited by the Southern Association of Colleges and Schools.

History

Stillman College was founded as Tuscaloosa Institute, when it was authorized by the General Assembly of the Presbyterian Church in the United States in 1875, and held its first classes in 1876. It was chartered as a legal corporation by the State of Alabama in 1895. At that time, the name was changed from Tuscaloosa Institute to Stillman Institute. The institute was a concept initiated by Charles Allen Stillman, pastor of First Presbyterian Church of Tuscaloosa, "for the training of colored men for the ministry". A junior and senior high school was organized and the Institute established a junior college program, which was accredited in 1937. In addition, between 1930 and 1946, it operated a hospital and nurse training school. 

Under the administration of Samuel Burney Hay (1948–1965), the school sought to expand into a senior liberal arts institution and in 1948 the name was officially changed to Stillman College. The following year, Stillman expanded into a four-year college and graduated its first baccalaureate class in 1951. The college was accredited by the Southern Association of Colleges and Schools in 1953. Under Hay, seven new buildings were constructed: a gymnasium, a library, an administration-classroom building, two women's residence halls, a prayer chapel, and a student center.

When John Rice became the Dean of Students at Stillman College in 1966, he lived on campus with his wife and daughter, Condoleezza Rice, who later served as the 66th United States Secretary of State.
 
Harold N. Stinson (1967–1980) was the first African American to assume the presidency. Under his dynamic leadership, new programs designed to improve educational quality were instituted, and the physical plant was expanded with the addition of two men's residence halls, faculty apartments, a maintenance building, and a mathematics-science center. Snedecor Hall, Batchelor Building, and Birthright Auditorium were renovated.  During his presidency, the college graduated its first non-black student, Constance M. Rizzi, in 1978.
 
Under the leadership of the college's fourth president, Cordell Wynn (1982–1997), the appearance of the campus improved dramatically; Winsborough and John Knox Halls were renovated; and the Marie Lundy Wynn Hall and Johnson/Robinson Student Health Center were erected. The enrollment grew beyond 1,000 students; the endowment increased significantly; and the educational program was broadened to include the Stillman Management Institute and a community-service component.

On July 1, 1997, Ernest McNealey (1997–2013) was named the fifth president. During his tenure, Stillman garnered national attention in the areas of technology, athletics and scholarly pursuits. One of the leaders in wireless computing, the college received the National Innovation in Technology Award by Apple Computers and continues to be on the cusp of technological innovations in higher education. The college's football program and marching band were revitalized and the college experienced its largest enrollment in the history of the institution. In 2004 the college received its first-ever ranking among top-tier schools in U.S. News & World Report. During McNealey's tenure, four new structures were erected (School of Education building, Wynn Fine Arts Center, Roulhac Residence Hall, and the stadium with accompanying playing fields, buildings, and an NCAA regulation track). The sense of place was further manifested in the  construction of the Thomas E. Lyle Band Center and NCAA regulation tennis complex.

On June 26, 2014, at a press conference in Birthright Alumni Hall, Stillman Board of Trustees named interim president Peter E. Millet the sixth president of the school.  In August 2014, Stillman was awarded a donation of $2 million by an unknown donor to help with the long term stability of the college.  On December 29, 2014, President Peter E. Millet announced via school email that tuition for the small liberal arts school would be reduced from $22,500 to $17,500 in an effort to boost enrollment and make college more affordable.  On January 1, 2015, Stillman became a smoke-free campus in an effort to keep with its theme of promoting a healthier lifestyle.  In December 2015, Stillman cut its current sports from 12 to 2. Currently, Stillman has four intercollegiate sports teams, Men's and Women's Basketball, Baseball, and Softball.

On December 14, 2016, the Stillman College Board of Trustees announced the appointment of Cynthia Warrick as the new Interim President for Stillman College. She took office on January 3, 2017.  On April 24, 2017, Cynthia Warrick (2017-) was named the seventh president and the first female president of Stillman College.

The school's Tuscaloosa campus was listed on the National Register of Historic Places in 2021.

Student activities

Performance arts

Band 

Stillman College's band program was started in 1955. The "Pride of the South", also known as the "Blue Pride" Marching Tiger Band (BPMT), includes a concert band and jazz band.

With an average membership of 120, the "Blue Pride" Marching Tiger Band is a historically black college musical show unit that is organized during the fall football season.  Membership is open to all qualified students enrolled at the college, regardless of their major field.

In February 2010, Stillman College dedicated a brand new facility, the Thomas Lyle Band Center, named in honor of former band director Thomas Lyle, in conjunction with the Wynn Fine Arts Center. In the fall of 2013, the "Blue Pride" Marching Tiger Band participated in the Annual Turkey Day Classic against Alabama State University. The marching band is represented in the Xbox 360 game Black College Football: BCFX: The Xperience playing selections of Sing a Song and Word Up.

The band offers two honor and service organizations: Kappa Kappa Psi, Kappa Omicron Chapter & Tau Beta Sigma, Theta Chi Chapter.

Choir 

The Stillman College Concert Choir, under the direction of Jocqueline K. Richardson, is a choral ensemble of students, both music and non-music majors. The choir's repertoire consists of a variety of sacred and secular choral literature from the Renaissance to the contemporary periods in music history. The concert choir performs at college events, local and regional churches and special events throughout the academic year and serves as an ambassador of Stillman College.

Fraternities and sororities 
Seven of the National Pan-Hellenic Council organizations currently have chapters at Stillman College. These organizations are:

National Honor Societies
 Beta Kappa Chi (Science)
 Alpha Kappa Mu (AKM)

Athletics

The Stillman athletic teams are called the Tigers and Lady Tigers. The college is a member of the Division I level of the National Association of Intercollegiate Athletics (NAIA), primarily competing in the Southern States Athletic Conference (SSAC; formerly known as Georgia–Alabama–Carolina Conference (GACC) until after the 2003–04 school year) since the 2018–19 academic year. The Tigers and Lady Tigers previously competed as a member of the Southern Intercollegiate Athletic Conference (SIAC) from 1978–79 to 1998–99, and again from 2002–03 to 2015–16, which is currently a NCAA Division II athletic conference; as a member of the Great South Athletic Conference (GSAC) of the NCAA Division III ranks from 1999–2000 to 2001–02; and as an NAIA Independent within the Association of Independent Institutions (AII) from 2016–17 to 2017–18.

Stillman currently competes in eight intercollegiate varsity sports: Men's sports include baseball, basketball, cross country and track & field; while women's sports include basketball, cross country, softball and track & field. Stillman formerly sponsored football from the 1999 fall season until the 2015 fall season, when the school eliminated all athletic teams, except for men's and women's basketball, due to increased costs associated with the athletic program.

In Fall 2018, the college added men's and women's cross country and track and field. Stillman plans to bring back volleyball in the fall of 2022 and add women's bowling in the fall of 2023.

Accomplishments
Recent Athletic accomplishments include:

 Men's Basketball – In 2018 the Men's Basketball Team was the NAIA A.I.I Conference Champs.  Losing in the opening round of the National Tournament, the men finished the season with a record o 27–5, losing only one game at home.  The Tigers swept the conference awards with the Coach of the Year, Defensive Player of the Year, Newcomer of the Year, and a first Team Honorable mention. 2006 and 2016 SIAC Championship; In the 2009–10 season, 1 year removed from taking over a 1–27 team, head coach Michael Grant led the men's basketball team to the school's first ever appearance in the National Top 25 rankings.
 Women's Basketball – In 2018, the Lady Tigers were the NAIA A.I.I. Conference Champ Runner Ups.  The Lady Tigers lost in the opening round of the National Tournament and finished with a 19–12 record.
 Baseball – In 2018, the Tigers finished their season with a record of 19–22; 2007–08 SIAC Championships; 2007 Division II National Championship
 Softball – The 2018 Lady Tigers Softball team finished with a record of 18–18, an impressive record considering the installation of a new coach in December and a 0–8 start to the season.

Residential life 
There are four dorms on campus.The three male dorms are Knox, Hay and Wynn. The dorm for female students is Roulhac. It is recommended that freshman students reside on campus. The Grand Apartments is off-campus housing managed by Stillman.

Notable alumni

Notable faculty
 Presbyterian clergyman Andrew Flinn Dickson, the first professor of the Institute for the Training of Colored Ministers in October 1876
 Michael Hill taught British history at Stillman before founding the League of the South, a neo-Confederate and white supremacist organization.

See also
 List of historically black colleges and universities

References

External links
 
 Official athletics website

 
Historically black universities and colleges in the United States
Educational institutions established in 1876
Universities and colleges accredited by the Southern Association of Colleges and Schools
Universities and colleges affiliated with the Presbyterian Church (USA)
African-American history of Alabama
Education in Tuscaloosa, Alabama
Buildings and structures in Tuscaloosa, Alabama
1876 establishments in Alabama
Private universities and colleges in Alabama
National Register of Historic Places in Tuscaloosa County, Alabama